Ematheudes quintuplex is a species of snout moth in the genus Ematheudes. It was described by Jay C. Shaffer in 1998 and is known from the Democratic Republic of the Congo.

References

Moths described in 1998
Anerastiini